"She's No You" is the second single in Jesse McCartney's debut album, Beautiful Soul. The single was released in 2005. McCartney, who co-wrote the song, says he was in a caffeine "buzz" when he wrote it, hence the fast pace it has.  The radio edit was packaged into the 2006 Hannah Montana soundtrack CD. "She's No You" is set to the key of G Major with a tempo of 180 beats per minute.

Music video
The entire video for "She's No You" was shot in black and white and was shown on TRL. It also stars his ex-girlfriend Katie Cassidy, who he was dating at the time. The video is basically Jesse trying to find Katie, walking down streets, crossing roads, etc. Near the end of the video he finds her. She runs up to him and the two enjoy a lengthy kiss. They later hail a taxi and drive home.

Another video is available for the song. It shows Jesse singing with a band and some scenes showing him singing on a couch with two women.

Track listing
CD version 1
 "She's No You" (single version) – 3:35
 "Take Your Sweet Time" (Sugar Mix) – 4:04

CD version 2
"She's No You" (radio edit) – 3:05
"She's No You" (Neptunes Remix featuring Fabolous) – 3:37
"She's No You" (Neptunes Remix) – 3:05
"She's No You" (video; New Zealand only) – 3:16

Remixes 12"
 "She's No You" (Neptunes Remix featuring Fabolous) – 3:37
 "She's No You" (instrumental) – 3:36
 "She's No You" (a cappella) – 3:35
 "She's No You" (radio edit) – 3:05

Promo
"She's No You" (album version) – 3:35
"She's No You" (video download) – 3:16

Charts performance
The song debuted on the Billboard Hot 100 chart of May 21, 2005, at number 91. The single fared better on the Pop 100, peaking at #41. "She's No You" peaked at #10 on the Australian ARIA Singles Chart and #16 in New Zealand.

Charts

Year-end charts

References

2004 songs
2005 singles
Jesse McCartney songs
Hollywood Records singles
Music videos directed by Sanji (director)
Song recordings produced by Matthew Gerrard
Songs written by Matthew Gerrard
Songs written by Jesse McCartney
Songs written by Robbie Nevil